This is a list of films which placed number one at the weekend box office for the year 2021 in Thailand.

References

Thailand
2021 in Thailand
2021